Aerography is a surrealist method in which a stencil used in spraypainting is replaced by a three-dimensional object; in extreme cases male artists have used their genitals as stencils. The aerography technique is most recognizable as a blended and photorealistic style. The method has been used to decorate tiles from the Victorian era
 and in the works of Man Ray.

Aerography on cars 
  
Aerography is commonly used on vehicles. It adds an appealing and attracting effect, by presenting an image on the hood, on the side, or all around.

References 

Surrealist techniques